Mike Working (born December 16, 1947) is an American former gridiron football player and coach.  He was the 16th head football coach at Appalachian State University, serving from 1980 to 1982.    He coached at McDonogh School, and after a hazing incident involving his sons, coached at Mount Saint Joseph.

Head coaching record

References

1947 births
Living people
Army Black Knights football coaches
Appalachian State Mountaineers football coaches
Detroit Lions coaches
Hamilton Tiger-Cats coaches
North Carolina Tar Heels football coaches
North Carolina Tar Heels football players
Tennessee Volunteers football coaches
Tulsa Golden Hurricane football coaches
Wake Forest Demon Deacons football coaches
West Virginia Mountaineers football coaches
Winnipeg Blue Bombers coaches
High school football coaches in Maryland